Sofia Paldanius (born 16 March 1979) is a Swedish sprint canoer who has competed since the mid-2000s. Her latest success is when she was fourth at the Olympic Games in London in K1 500 2012. She won four bronze medals at the ICF Canoe Sprint World Championships (K-1 1000 m: 2007, 2010; K-2 500 m: 2009, K-4 200 m: 2006).

Paldanius also competed in three Summer Olympics, earning her best finish of fourth in the K-2 500 m event at London in 2012.

In January 2017 it was announced she would stop competing at top-level.

References

External links
 
 
 
 
 
 

1979 births
Canoeists at the 2004 Summer Olympics
Canoeists at the 2008 Summer Olympics
Canoeists at the 2012 Summer Olympics
Canoeists at the 2016 Summer Olympics
Living people
Olympic canoeists of Sweden
Swedish female canoeists
ICF Canoe Sprint World Championships medalists in kayak